Tibbe Historic District, also known as the Lustigestrumpf (Fancy Stocking) Historic District, is a national historic district located at Washington, Franklin County, Missouri. The district encompasses 23 contributing buildings in a predominantly residential section of Washington. The district developed between about 1857 and 1941, and includes representative examples of Queen Anne, Colonial Revival, and Bungalow / American Craftsman style residential architecture.

It was listed on the National Register of Historic Places in 1990.

References

Historic districts on the National Register of Historic Places in Missouri
Queen Anne architecture in Missouri
Colonial Revival architecture in Missouri
Bungalow architecture in Missouri
Buildings and structures in Franklin County, Missouri
National Register of Historic Places in Franklin County, Missouri